Outtrigger was a Swedish metal group from Helsingborg established by Timmy Andersson and Simon Peyron in 2009 when they were classmates. In 2010, three other members joined in, Joakim Agnemyr, Adam Axelsson and John Lofgren, making it a 5-piece band. Originally lead vocals was Oliver Buvac, until he left and lead vocals was taken over by co-founder Simon Peyron. The band played live concerts and in 2012 came second in the music competition Rockkarusellen and again second in 2013 in Popkorn, Skåne's largest music competition.

The band's breakthrough came with a metal cover of Robin Stjernberg's song "You" the day after the song won the Melodifestivalen 2013.

In November 2013, it was announced that Outtriger was taking part in Melodifestivalen 2014 in a bid to represent Sweden in the 2014 Eurovision Song Contest. Singing their song "Echo" on February 15 preliminary semi-finals, they were given a Second Chance, with a duel against Elena Paparizou with Paparizou qualifying and Outtrigger failing to reach the Melodifestivalen final.

In 2018 Adam, Outrigger's lead guitar has officially announced that the band is no longer active.

Members
Simon Peyron - vocals (formerly also guitar)
Joakim Agnemyr - bass
Adam Axelsson - guitar
John Lofgren - drums

Previous members
Oliver Buvac - vocals
Timmy Andersson - guitar

Discography

EPs
2010: Untestified Revolution (EP)
2014: Echo (EP)
2014: The Last of Us

Singles

References

External links
Official website

Swedish alternative metal musical groups
Swedish metalcore musical groups
Swedish hard rock musical groups
Melodifestivalen contestants of 2014